Marginella emmae is a species of sea snail, a marine gastropod mollusk in the family Marginellidae, the margin snails.

Description

Distribution
This marine species occurs off Somalia.

References

 Bozzetti L. (1988). A new Marginella from Somalia. La Conchiglia. 228-229: 4.
 Cossignani T. (2006). Marginellidae & Cystiscidae of the World. L'Informatore Piceno. 408pp

emmae
Gastropods described in 1998